The Chapel of San José (Spanish: Capilla de San José) is a chapel located in Sevilla, Spain. It was declared Bien de Interés Cultural in 1912.

See also 

 List of Bien de Interés Cultural in the Province of Seville

References 

Bien de Interés Cultural landmarks in the Province of Seville